Chuq or CHUQ may refer to:

 Çük, a holiday that was celebrated by Tatars, Chuvash, and Udmurt peoples
 CHUQ, an acronym for Centre hospitalier universitaire de Québec, a local hospital network in Quebec City, Canada